Quebracho Herrado may refer to:

Quebracho Herrado, Córdoba, a small community in San Justo Department of Córdoba Province, Argentina
Battle of Quebracho Herrado (28 November 1840), an engagement in the Argentine Civil wars